Academia da Força Aérea (Portuguese for "Air Force Academy") may refer to:

Brazilian Air Force Academy, the air force academy of Brazil
Portuguese Air Force Academy, the air force academy of Portugal